Adilkhan Garahmadov (born 5 June 2001) is an Azerbaijani footballer who plays as a midfielder for Sabail in the Azerbaijan Premier League.

Club career
On 2 March 2019, Garahmadov made his debut in the Azerbaijan Premier League for Sabail match against Sumgayit.

References

External links
 

2001 births
Living people
Association football midfielders
Azerbaijani footballers
Azerbaijan youth international footballers
Azerbaijan Premier League players
Sabail FK players